The korfball event at the 2005 World Games in Duisburg, Germany took place between the 14 to 24 July 2005. A total of 96 athletes from 6 national teams entered the competition. The competition took place at Sportpark Duisburg.

Teams 

 Germany (Host Country)
 Netherlands (Defending Champion)
 Chinese Taipei
 Czech Republic
 Belgium
 Great Britain

Results

Final standings

References 

2005 World Games
2005 in korfball